Cryptonchidae is a family of nematodes belonging to the order Enoplida.

Genera:
 Cryptonchus  Cobb, 1913

References

Nematode families